Dieter Rauscher (born 28 April 1942) is a German weightlifter. He competed in the men's featherweight event at the 1968 Summer Olympics.

References

1942 births
Living people
German male weightlifters
Olympic weightlifters of West Germany
Weightlifters at the 1968 Summer Olympics
People from Cheb